Lukavec is a village in central Croatia, 20 km south of Zagreb. It is administratively part of the city of Velika Gorica, Zagreb County. The population is 1,140 (census 2011). A nearby fortification is well preserved.

References

Populated places in Zagreb County
Velika Gorica